Shewket Yalqun (born 7 February 1993 in Artux), formerly known as Memet Ali, is a Chinese footballer who plays for Chinese Super League side Guangzhou Evergrande.

Club career
Shewket Yalqun transferred to Chinese Super League side Guangzhou Evergrande for a fee of ¥100,000 in January 2012. He used the name Memet Ali to register for the 2012 league season. He made his senior debut on 30 March 2012 in a 1–0 away win against Shanghai Shenhua, coming on as a substitute for Gao Lin in the 81st minute. However, he was sent to play for the reserve team after Italian manager Marcello Lippi took charge of the team. Shewket made six league appearances during the 2012 season. 

He was involved in an age controversy in early 2013 when Guangzhou Evergrande found out he used a different name Shewket Yalqun to register in the league. Guangzhou reported it to the Chinese Football Association. In March 2013, he received a ban of three months for age falsification. He returned to field on 10 July 2013 in the fourth round of 2013 Chinese FA Cup in which Guangzhou beat Dalian Ruilong 7–1. On 7 August 2013, he scored his first senior goal in the fifth round of FA Cup which ensured Guangzhou draw with Hangzhou Greentown 2–2 after 90 minutes and beat Hangzhou 5–3 in the penalty shootout.

In January 2014, Shewket moved to China League One side Qingdao Hainiu on a one-year loan deal. He made his debut for the club on 15 March 2014 in a 1-1 draw against Chengdu Tiancheng. In January 2015, he was loaned to League One side Xinjiang Tianshan Leopard for one year. Xinjiang extended his loan deal for another year at the beginning of 2016 season.

Career statistics 
Statistics accurate as of match played 31 December 2020.

Honours

Club
Guangzhou Evergrande
Chinese Super League: 2012, 2013
Chinese FA Super Cup: 2012
Chinese FA Cup: 2012
AFC Champions League: 2013

References

External links
Player stats at Sohu.com

1993 births
Living people
Association football forwards
Uyghur sportspeople
Chinese footballers
Chinese people of Uyghur descent
Footballers from Xinjiang
Guangzhou F.C. players
Qingdao F.C. players
Xinjiang Tianshan Leopard F.C. players
People from Kizilsu
Chinese Super League players
China League One players